Poysdorf is a town in the district of Mistelbach in the Austrian state of Lower Austria.

Population

Sights
 Vino Versum Poysdorf, a museum about wine and the history of Poysdorf as one of the leading wine towns in Austria.

Climate

References

External links 

Cities and towns in Mistelbach District